Grabfeld is a municipality in the district Schmalkalden-Meiningen, in Thuringia, Germany.

Grabfeld was established as a municipality on December 1, 2007 by combining the former municipalities of Behrungen, Berkach, Bibra, Exdorf, Jüchsen, Nordheim, Queienfeld, Rentwertshausen, Schwickershausen and Wolfmannshausen, replacing the former Verwaltungsgemeinschaft of the same name. It was joined by the former municipality Bauerbach in January 2012, and by Wölfershausen in January 2019.

History
Within the German Empire (1871–1918), the territory of the present-day municipality of Grabfeld was part of the Duchy of Saxe-Meiningen.

References 

Former Verwaltungsgemeinschaften in Thuringia
Schmalkalden-Meiningen
Duchy of Saxe-Meiningen